Villaguay is a department of the province of Entre Ríos  (Argentina).

References 

Departments of Entre Ríos  Province